Matias Masucci is an Italian-born American writer, independent filmmaker and actor. Masucci has been a proponent of digital independent cinema and self distribution since the early 2000s. His work includes the short film happiending (2008) the independent feature film Noise Matters (2013) and both fiction and non-fiction writings.

Life and career
Masucci was born in the city of Novara, in northern Italy, where he began his acting career in theater while in school. At age eighteen he relocated to Hollywood and later appeared in the television series CSI: NY (2004) and The Bold and the Beautiful (2005). His transition behind the camera began first as a screenwriter with the short film A Short One (2006) and later as a director with the mockumentary short Rotting Dancers (2007). Masucci has written, produced and directed several short films including the award-winning happiending (2008). His feature length directorial debut came with the film Noise Matters (2013) which premiered in London at the 20th edition of the Raindance Film Festival in 2012. He has cited among his cinematic influences the works of Luis Buñuel, Robert Bresson and Federico Fellini.

His literary works include short stories, screenplays, essays and articles, and have been featured in various digital and print publications. Masucci produces and distributes most of his work through his brand Independent Society.

Filmography

References

External links
 Independent Society
 

Living people
People from Novara
Italian film directors
Italian male film actors
Italian screenwriters
Italian male screenwriters
Year of birth missing (living people)